Rabbi Yaakov Yitzhak Neumann or Neimann (1920, Pápa, Hungary  – 2007, Montreal), also known as "Pupa Rav," was the rabbi of Montreal's Belzer hasidim from 1953 until his death in 2007.

Life
Neumann was born in Pápa, Hungary. His father Yosef ben Benzion Neuman was also a rabbi.

Rabbinical career 
After surviving the Holocaust, in which his wife and only son, Nuchem, was killed, Neumann served as head of the remaining Hungarian Pápa community (abt. 1948), from which he gained the title, Puper Rav.

He then emigrated to Australia and then in 1953 to Montreal where there was a Belzer community.

He died in 2007, at the age of 87 without children.

Sources 
 Bauer, Julien, “Les communautés hassidiques de Montréal.” Dans P. Anctil et I. Robinson (dir.), Les communautés juives de Montréal, Sillery, Septentrion, 2011, p. 216-233.
 Gutwirth, Jacques. "Hassidism and Urban Life." Jewish Journal of Sociology 38, 1996, p. 107-15.
 Gutwirth, Jacques. "The Structure of a Hassidic Community in Montreal." The Jewish Journal of Sociology 14, 1972, p. 43-62.
 Lapidus, Steven. "The Forgotten Hassidim: Rabbis and Rebbes in Prewar Canada." Canadian Jewish Studies Journal/Revue d’études juives canadiennes, vol. 12, 2004, p. 1-30.
 Shaffir, William. "Chassidic Communities in Montreal." The Canadian Jewish Mosaic. Eds. Morton Weinfeld, Irwin Cotler, William Shaffir ed. Rexdale, Ont.: J. Wiley & Sons Canada, 1981, p. 273-86. Print.
 Tannenbaum, Gershon. "Rabbi Koppelman Visits Australia." Jewish Press: Americas Largest Independent Jewish Weekly. Web. 01 Nov. 2010.
Besser, Yisroel. "Posek, Father, Friend" in Mishpacha Magezine: issue 145 February 2007

References 

People from Pápa
2007 deaths
Anglophone Quebec people
Australian Orthodox rabbis
Canadian Hasidic rabbis
Canadian people of Hungarian-Jewish descent
Holocaust survivors
Hungarian emigrants to Canada
Hungarian expatriates in Australia
Hungarian Orthodox rabbis
People from Montreal
Belz (Hasidic dynasty)
1920 births